The Welspun Solar MP project is a 151 megawatt (MW) photovoltaic power station built in Bhagwanpura village, just south of Diken, Jawad tehsil of Neemuch district, Madhya Pradesh state, in central India.

Operational since February 2014, it is one of the largest solar power projects in India. It will supply power at 8.05 rupees per kW·h (13,31 cents/kW·h). Welspun Energy Ltd. (WEL) has built the plant through its subsidiary, Welspun Solar Madhya Pradesh Private Limited (WSMPPL) and is mitigating 216,372 tonnes of carbon emission annually, while giving power to 624,000 homes. The average capacity utilization factor of these solar plants are way above the CREC's 19% norm. The solar PV modules used employ polycrystalline silicon photovoltaic technology with a module capacity of a 235 Wp each and are connected to inverters with an output of 630 kWe each. The generated electricity would be exported to the regional North-East-West-North East (NEWNE) electricity grid in India, after being stepped up to 132 kV. The site, which sits on a 500-meter-high barren land ridge, receives among the highest levels of irradiation in India, with a measured DNI (Direct Normal Irradiance) at about 2076 kW·h/m2. The life time of the Solar PV power plant is estimated in 25 years.

See also

 Solar power in India
 List of photovoltaic power stations
 Photovoltaics
 Renewable energy
 Solar energy

References

Photovoltaic power stations in India
Solar power stations in Madhya Pradesh
Neemuch district
Welspun Group
Energy infrastructure completed in 2013
2013 establishments in Madhya Pradesh